Yevgeni Viktorovich Nabokov (born July 25, 1975) is a Kazakhstani-Russian former professional ice hockey goaltender who played for the San Jose Sharks, New York Islanders, and Tampa Bay Lightning of National Hockey League (NHL) and for Torpedo Ust-Kamenogorsk, Dynamo Moscow, Metallurg Magnitogorsk and SKA Saint Petersburg of the Russian Super League (RSL) and Kontinental Hockey League (KHL) from 1991 to 2015.

Nicknamed "Nabby", Nabokov, who was selected 219th overall 1994 NHL Entry Draft by San Jose, was regarded as one of the top goaltenders in the NHL, winning the Calder Memorial Trophy as the best first-year player in 2001 and was voted a finalist for the Vezina Trophy as best goaltender in 2008. He departed the NHL for the first time in 2010 to play for SKA Saint Petersburg in Russia, but returned soon after, and concluded his career in the NHL. After retiring as a player Nabokov took up a role as a development coach for the Sharks, and in 2019 was named the goaltending coach for team.

In his first nine seasons in the NHL, all with San Jose, Nabokov became the team leader in nearly every goaltending category, including games played, wins, and shutouts. At his retirement, he had the eighteenth most all-time NHL regular season wins. During a game in 2002 he scored a goal, the seventh goalie in NHL history to do so, and the first not from North America.

Born in the then-Soviet republic of Kazakhstan, Nabokov first played internationally with Kazakhstan at the 1994 World Championships Group C. However, he later joined the Russian national team, and played for them from 2006, including both the 2006 and 2010 Winter Olympics, winning a gold at the 2008 World Championships.

Playing career

Russia and move to North America
Nabokov first played for his hometown team, Torpedo Ust-Kamenogorsk, spending three years with the club from 1991 until 1994. After his last season with the club he was selected in the 1994 NHL Entry Draft by the San Jose Sharks in the ninth round, 219th overall. Tim Burke, the Sharks' scout, was originally scouting for a different goalie when he heard of Nabokov. The Sharks never saw Nabokov play before selecting him in the draft, and did not contact him until 1997. The following season Nabokov moved to join Dynamo Moscow, where he would spend the next three seasons. His first year with Dynamo they won the league championship It was after the 1996–97 season, which saw Nabokov help Dynamo reach the final of the European Hockey League, that he was contacted by the Sharks and offered a contract and come to North America.

Happy to play for Dynamo Moscow, Nabokov was initially reluctant to move to North America and play for the Sharks minor league affiliates, but decided to on the advice of his parents. Assigned to the Kentucky Thoroughblades, the Sharks' affiliate in the American Hockey League (AHL), he struggled to adapt to the new surroundings and style of hockey, and was ready to return to Russia during his first year. However he decided to stay after meeting his future wife, Tabitha, and refining his playing style with the Sharks goaltending coach, Warren Strelow. Used as the Thoroughblades back-up goalie, Nabokov only played in 33 games for the team. The following season was much better as he stayed near the AHL leaders in nearly every goaltending category, though he missed time due to appendicitis; he appeared in 43 games for Kentucky, winning 26 of them.

San Jose Sharks
Nabokov started the 1999–2000 season with the Sharks affiliate, the Cleveland Lumberjacks of the International Hockey League (IHL). After 20 games with Cleveland, where he had a record of twelve wins, four losses, and three ties, Nabokov was  recalled to the Sharks to serve as the back-up to Steve Shields, after Mike Vernon was traded. Nabokov made his NHL debut on January 1, 2000, in relief of Shields, against the Nashville Predators. His first start came January 19 against the Colorado Avalanche; Nabokov made 39 saves for his first shutout in a 0–0 tie. He finished with 11 games played for the Sharks during the 1999–00 NHL season, winning two and losing two.

In the second game of the 2000–01 season, Shields hurt his ankle, leaving Nabokov to become the starting goalie. He appeared in 66 games and had a record of 32 wins and 21 losses, and was named to the mid-season All-Star Game. In recognition of his play, Nabokov was named the winner of the Calder Memorial Trophy as the rookie of the year, and was named to the year-end All-Rookie team; he also finished fourth in voting for the Vezina Trophy for best goalie in the league. He had similar success the following season, with 37 wins and 7 shutouts in 67 games, and on March 10, 2002 he scored a goal against the Vancouver Canucks, both the first European goalie to do so, and the first goalie to score a powerplay goal.

At the start of the 2002–03 season, Nabokov held out in a contract dispute. After making less than $1 million the previous two seasons, he felt he deserved an increase in salary, speculated to be around $4 million per season. He missed five games before the team signed him to a two-year contract worth slightly more than $3.5 million per season. Both Nabokov and the Sharks had a poor season, with the team missing the playoffs for the first time in six years, and Nabokov only winning 19 games, and finishing with a losing record. This was improved upon in 2003–04 though, as Nabokov's 31 wins helped the team reach the playoffs again, where they reached the third round for the first time in team history. A further two-year extension signed in 2004 saw him earn almost $4.5 million per year.

Nabokov was considered one of the elite goaltenders in the NHL, and was often ranked as one of the top ten, if not top five goaltenders in the NHL by ESPN The Magazine and The Hockey News. However, the 2005–06 season was an off year for Nabokov, and his save percentage of under .900 was a big concern to the team. He was relegated to the role of backup goaltender behind Vesa Toskala. Despite his less-than-stellar play, Nabokov was signed to a four-year contract extension worth roughly $21.5 million in February 2006. The contract had a no-trade clause that was activated on the condition that San Jose made the playoffs.

During the 2006–07 NHL season, Nabokov split the starting goaltending duties with Toskala. In the Sharks 82 games Nabokov started 49. Nabokov played all 5 games in the Western Conference Quarterfinals of the 2007 NHL playoffs, helping the Sharks defeat the Nashville Predators in 5 games.

During the first half of the 2007–08 NHL season, Nabokov started the first 43 games for the Sharks, however on January 13, 2008, in Anaheim he received his first day off when Thomas Greiss started his first NHL game. Nabokov was recognized as one of the "Three Stars" for the NHL in the last week of December 2007, along with Alexander Ovechkin of the Washington Capitals and Jaromír Jágr of the New York Rangers. In addition to that honor, Nabokov was named the "Sharks Player of the Month" by Seagate Technology in December. Since the 1996–97 season, Seagate Technology has recognized Sharks players who made contributions to further the team’s accomplishments and makes a donation of $2,500 to The Sharks Foundation on the players’ behalf. Nabokov holds the franchise-record for having won this award nine times.

Nabokov played in his second NHL All-Star Game on January 27, 2008. He stopped all eight shots that came at him, marking the first time since Nikolai Khabibulin's period in the 2002 game that a goalie played an All-Star period where no goals were scored. He secured the scoreless period when he blocked both of Ilya Kovalchuk’s shots in the last minute of the second period. On May 4, during game six of the 2008 NHL Playoffs Western Conference Semi-Finals, Nabokov made what has been called one of the best glove saves in decades, when he saved a shot from Brad Richards of the Dallas Stars by sliding over from the other side of the post and gloving the puck. The save was reviewed for several minutes before making it clear Nabokov saved it before it went over the goal line. The game, which ended in a Dallas victory, lasted for four overtime periods and is the eighth longest game in the league's history.

Nabokov recorded 41 wins for San Jose during the following season as the team clinched first overall in the Western Conference and the league. Despite this, San Jose was  eliminated in the first round of the playoffs by eighth seed Anaheim Ducks, marking just the fourth time that an eighth seed team defeated a first seed team in the first round of the playoffs. On October 17, 2009, he played in his 500th career game, all played with the Sharks, and stopped 31 shots in a 4–1 win over the New York Islanders. On February 11, 2010, Nabokov stopped a career-high 50 shots en route to a 3–2 shootout victory against the Detroit Red Wings, which was also his 11th consecutive road victory, a new NHL record.

Later career

At the conclusion of the 2009-10 season Nabokov was told by the Sharks general manager Doug Wilson that he would not be offered a new contract, with the team unable to meet his salary demands due to the NHL salary cap. An unrestricted free agent, Nabokov did not see any offers from NHL teams, and so signed a contract with SKA St. Petersburg of the Kontinental Hockey League (KHL). The deal was reported to be for $24 million over four years. The salary was in line with demands Nabokov had apparently been seeking, though he denied money was a factor, but rather signed because of the length of the contract. Nabokov struggled in the KHL, and after 22 games with SKA he was released by the team in December, which cited "family circumstances" in a statement. During his lone season in the KHL, Nabokov recorded eight wins and eight losses, with a goals against average and save percentage far above his career averages.

Once again a free agent, Nabokov signed a contract with the Detroit Red Wings on January 20, 2011; the Red Wings were one of the top teams in the NHL at the time, and Nabokov signed a contract for just $570,000 as a result. However as he had started the season in the KHL, NHL rules required him to be placed on waivers prior to joining the Red Wings, and thus be available at that salary to any team lower than them in the standings. He was subsequently claimed by the New York Islanders, who were one of the worst teams in the NHL at the time. As he had only signed with Detroit in hopes of playing in the playoffs that year, Nabokov refused to join the Islanders, stating that he didn't make a lot of sense to him why they claimed him. The Islanders suspended Nabokov for failing to join the team, and he sat out the rest of the season.

In August 2011, Nabokov stated that he would be reporting to New York's training camp. He played for the team the entirety of the 2011–12 season, wearing the number 20, and eventually took over the starting goaltender position. He got his first win with the team on October 15, 2011, against the New York Rangers. On January 14, 2012, Nabokov recorded his 300th career win against the Buffalo Sabres, becoming the 26th goaltender to reach the milestone. On March 21, 2012 he signed a one-year, $2.75 million contract extension to remain with New York for another season, followed by another one-year $3.25 million contract for the 2013–14 season.

After New York signed goaltenders Jaroslav Halak and Chad Johnson in the 2014 off-season, it became clear they didn't have plans to re-sign Nabokov. On July 1, 2014, he signed a one-year contract with the Tampa Bay Lightning worth $1.55 million. After posting a 3–6–2 record as the team's backup goaltender to Ben Bishop, he was placed on waivers around the midpoint of the season, February 1, 2015. Following his waivers clear, it was questioned as to whether he would report to Tampa Bay's AHL affiliate or consider retirement. On February 9, 2015, Nabokov was traded back to the Sharks for "future considerations". He announced his retirement on February 11, 2015.

Post-playing career
In September 2015, Nabokov became a goaltending development coach and scout in the Sharks organization; in addition to the Sharks, he worked with the goaltenders on the team's AHL affiliate San Jose Barracuda. On December 11, 2019, after head coach Peter DeBoer and his assistants were fired, Nabokov was named the Sharks' goaltending coach under interim coach Bob Boughner.

International career

Nabokov first played an international tournament with Kazakhstan at the 1994 World Championships C Pool. He appeared in three games as Kazakhstan finished fourth in the tournament. This appearance would prevent Nabokov from playing for Russia at the 2002 Winter Olympics. Though Nabokov appealed to play, International Ice Hockey Federation (IIHF) bylaws stated that players cannot represent two different countries after the age of 18; as Nabokov was 19 during his appearance with Kazakhstan, he was unable to play for Russia.

The IIHF granted Nabokov an exemption to play for Russia at the 2006 Winter Olympics. Nabokov would play seven games during the Olympics, winning four and earning three shutouts as the Russians finished fourth. He next represented Russia at the 2008 World Championships. Nabokov posted back-to-back shut-outs before defeating Canada 5-4 in the gold medal game. He was named to the tournament's all-star team and named best goaltender.

Nabokov next joined Russia for the 2008 IIHF World Championship, arriving after the Sharks were eliminated in the NHL playoffs. He appeared in five games, winning them all, and helped Russia win their first gold medal since 1993, and was named as the tournament's best goaltender and put on the tournament all-star team. The starting goalie for Russia at the 2010 Winter Olympics, Nabokov helped Russia reach the quarterfinals against Canada. However he allowed four goals in the first period and was subsequently pulled, with Russia ultimately losing 7–3. Nabokov finished the Olympics with a record of two wins and one loss as the Russians placed sixth overall. His final appearance in an international tournament was at the 2011 IIHF World Championship. Nabokov played four games for Russia, winning two and losing one, before a groin injury forced him to leave the tournament; Russia would finish fourth.

Personal life
Nabokov, an only child, was born in Ust-Kamenogorsk (now called Oskemen), in the Kazakh SSR (now Kazakhstan). His father, Viktor, was a former professional hockey goaltender who played 18 years in both Russia and Kazakhstan before he retired in 1987. After his playing career ended, Viktor established a goaltending school in the city, which Nabokov later attended. His mother, Tatyana, worked as an engineer in a local factory. Nabokov first played hockey when he was six years old, taking up the same position his father had played.

When he moved to North America in 1997, Nabokov initially went by the name "John", fearing that English speakers might have difficulty pronouncing his name.

Nabokov met his wife, Tabitha Eckler, shortly after he began playing in Kentucky. She was a college student and waitress at the time. They were married in 2001. They have two children together, daughter Emily (born in January 2004), and son Andrei (born on February 12, 2007).

Career statistics

Regular season and playoffs

International

Awards

NHL

San Jose Sharks

References

External links

 

1975 births
Living people
Calder Trophy winners
Cleveland Lumberjacks players
Ice hockey players at the 2006 Winter Olympics
Ice hockey players at the 2010 Winter Olympics
Kazakhstani ice hockey goaltenders
Kazakhstani people of Russian descent
Kazzinc-Torpedo players
Kentucky Thoroughblades players
Metallurg Magnitogorsk players
National Hockey League All-Stars
National Hockey League goaltenders who have scored in a game
New York Islanders players
Olympic ice hockey players of Russia
Russian expatriate sportspeople in the United States
Russian ice hockey goaltenders
San Jose Sharks coaches
San Jose Sharks draft picks
San Jose Sharks players
SKA Saint Petersburg players
Sportspeople from Oskemen
Tampa Bay Lightning players
Kazakhstani expatriate sportspeople in the United States
Expatriate ice hockey players in the United States
Kazakhstani expatriate ice hockey people
Russian expatriate ice hockey people